Oscar Edward "Ossie, King Oscar" Hansen (December 27, 1909 in Centerville, South Dakota – February 17, 1998) was an American professional ice hockey centre. He played for the St. Louis Flyers, Minneapolis Millers and St. Paul Saints, as well as eight NHL games for the Chicago Black Hawks.

Biography
Oscar Hansen (most newspapers spelled the name Hanson) was the most news printed athlete in Minnesota during his time and was the AHA league scoring champion in 1936–37 with 33 Goals in 47 games (62 Points), and again in 1938–39 with 37 goals in 48 games (1938–39 Oscar had 89 Points). Oscar was the best of the six Hansen brothers (who all played for Augsburg College in Minnesota. The Hansen brothers were the first line for the American Olympic Team in 1928. Oscar is regarded by many as one of the best American college players to ever play the game. Gordie Howe raved about Oscar's skill and ability to "dangle".

Oscar Hansen holds a college ice hockey record with three goals in one minute at Augsburg College in Minnesota (USA).

Oscar developed a mysterious leg injury (at the end of 1939) which is now thought to be MS (multiple sclerosis) which left him in a wheel chair for most of the second half of his life. He was cared for and loved by his wife Freda Hansen. Oscar's son David Oscar Hansen was also an ice hockey player scouted by the University of Minnesota as their top recruit. David's skill was equaled by his on ice temper which ultimately pushed him and the University of Minnesota apart. David Hansen played ice hockey and boxed for the US Army with a number of Minnesota greats.

Oscar and his brothers were given a homage by Paul Newman and crew in the 1977 film Slap Shot. Although the real life Hansen brothers (Oscar, Louis, Joe, Julius, Emery and Emil) were far from this tale, one of the Hansen brothers (Emil) may have been forced to end an on ice fight by a state trooper. The Hansen brothers were anything but goons as they dominated the college league and were put into national spotlight by their 1928 Olympic selection. The movie was a funny parody of their career, but in real life the Hansen brothers were serious ice hockey players.

US Olympic fallout
Three days short of the first game of the 1928 Olympics General MacArthur made a call stating that "we are not playing this year". This was a result of the "cold" relationship between Russia (Soviet Union) and the United States. The Russians raised questions about the Hansen's being American born. General MacArthur had papers showing the family was born in the United States and moved to Canada (Camrose, Alberta) to operate a large farm. General MacArthur was under presidential orders to pull out of the Olympic game as the United States and the Soviets were already on the brinks.

Later in life
Oscar and his wife Freda Hansen lived their later years in Edina, Minnesota with their son David close by and their son Jerry in Minneapolis and later Florida. David and his children (Melissa, Malinda and Curtis) and Jerry and his children (Frans, Courtney and Jordyn) remained close with Oscar and Freda until their passing. Oscar has six great grandchildren: Frans’s sons Hans and Anders Hansen, Courtney’s daughter Holland Hartington, Jordyn’s children Crew and Charley LeValley and Curtis’s daughters Marnie and Olivia Hansen.

External links

References

1909 births
1998 deaths
Canadian ice hockey centres
Chicago Blackhawks players
Minneapolis Millers (AHA) players
Ice hockey people from Alberta
People from Camrose, Alberta
People from Centerville, South Dakota